Fodoa or Fodowa is a town in the Kwahu West Municipal District of the Eastern Region of Ghana.

Location 
It is located along the Accra - Kumasi Highway near Nkawkaw.

Kwahu-Fodoa Community Day Senior High School is located in Fodoa, the school was in inaugurated by President John Dramani Mahama as part 200 community SHS project.

References

Populated places in the Eastern Region (Ghana)